Jean-Baptiste Gros (born 25 May 1999) is a French rugby union player. His position is prop and he currently plays for Toulon in the Top 14.

Honours

International 
 France (U20)
World Rugby Under 20 Championship winners (2): 2018, 2019

 France
Six Nations Championship: 2022
Grand Slam: 2022

References

External links
 
France profile at FFR
Toulon profile

1999 births
Living people
People from Arles
French rugby union players
France international rugby union players
RC Toulonnais players
Rugby union props
Sportspeople from Bouches-du-Rhône